From Left to Right is an album by American jazz pianist Bill Evans, released in 1971.

Reissues
 From Left to Right was reissued on CD by Verve Records on November 13, 1998 with bonus tracks.
From Left to Right was reissued on CD by Universal in 2005 with the same bonus tracks as the 1998 release.

Track listing
 "What Are You Doing the Rest of Your Life?" (Alan Bergman, Marilyn Bergman, Michel Legrand) – 4:05
 "I'm All Smiles" (Michael Leonard, Herbert Martin) – 5:42
 "Why Did I Choose You?" (Leonard, Martin) – 5:04
 "Soirée" (Earl Zindars) – 3:24
 "The Dolphin-Before" (Luíz Eça) – 3:05
 "The Dolphin-After" (Luíz Eça) – 3:06
 "Lullaby for Helene" (Earl Zindars) – 2:50
 "Like Someone in Love" (Johnny Burke, Jimmy Van Heusen) – 5:38
 "Children's Play Song" (Evans) – 4:11
Bonus tracks:
 "What Are You Doing the Rest of Your Life?" (Bergman, Bergman, Legrand) – 4:44
 "Why Did I Choose You?" (Leonard, Martin) – 4:18
 "Soirée" [alternate take] (Earl Zindars) – 3:26
 "Lullaby for Helene" (Earl Zindars) – 2:39

Personnel
Bill Evans – Steinway grand piano, Fender-Rhodes electric piano
Eddie Gómez – bass
Marty Morell – drums
Sam Brown – guitar
Michael Leonard – conductor, arranger
Unidentified brass, woodwinds and strings

References

External links
Jazz Discography entries for Bill Evans
Bill Evans Memorial Library discography

1971 albums
Bill Evans albums
MGM Records albums
Verve Records albums